Henry Villemot (c.1796-1870) was a 19th-century French playwright.

Works 
1823: Le Vendredi d'un usurier, comedy in 1 act
1823: Les Hussards dans l'étude, folie-vaudeville in 1 act, with Jules Dulong
1824: Le Plâtrier ou la double accusation, melodrama in 2 acts, with Théodore Nézel
1824: La Prise de Tarifa, mélodrame militaire historique in 1 act, with Nézel and Ferdinand Laloue
1825: Le Flâneur, comédie vaudeville in 1 act
1825: Le Chemin creux, melodrama in 3 acts, extravaganza
1825: Les Ruines de la Granca, mélodrame in 3 acts, with Dulong and Saint-Amand
1826: L'Amour et les poules, comédie-vaudeville in 1 act
1827: Le Garde et le bucheron, melodrama in 2 tableaux
1828: Bisson, melodrama in 2 acts and in 5 parts, extravaganza, with Benjamin Antier and Nézel
1828: Le Remplaçant, melodrama in 3 acts, with Antier
1829: La Partie d'ânes, folie in 1 act
1830: La Prise de la Bastille, gloire populaire et le passage du Mont-St-Bernard, gloire militaire, play in 2 periods and 7 tableaux
1830: Les Deux soufflets, comedy in 1 act, with Saint-Amand
1830: La Vieille des Vosges, melodrama in 2 acts, with Saint-Amand
1830: Youli, ou les Souliotes, melodrama in 2 acts and 5 tableaux, with Henri Franconi and Nézel
1831: Mingrat, melodrama in 4 acts, with Laloue
1831: Les Lions de Mysore, play in 3 acts and 7 tableaux, with Dulong

Bibliography 
 Joseph Marie Quérard, La France littéraire ou dictionnaire bibliographique des savants, historiens, 1837,  

19th-century French dramatists and playwrights
Place of birth missing
1790s births
1870 deaths